Teichiussa or Teichioussa was a town of ancient Caria or of Ionia in the territory of Miletus, and according to Thucydides and Stephanus of Byzantium, a possession of the latter city. It was a polis (city-state) and a member of the Delian League. During the Peloponnesian War, the Spartans struck at Iasos from here.

Its site is located near Kazıklı, Asiatic Turkey.

References

Populated places in ancient Caria
Populated places in ancient Ionia
Former populated places in Turkey
Greek city-states
Members of the Delian League